Jonancy is a small unincorporated community and coal town in Pike County, Kentucky, United States, in the far eastern part of the state. The latitude and longitude are 37.316N and -82.583W. Jonancy is in the Eastern Coal Field region. The community is in the Eastern time zone.

According to James Blake Miller, the hamlet's best-known resident, Jonancy was "named after my great-great-great grandparents: Joe and Nancy Miller ... [t]hey were the first people in those parts."

References

Unincorporated communities in Pike County, Kentucky
Unincorporated communities in Kentucky
Coal towns in Kentucky